Hecla or Thacla is a mountain on the island of South Uist in the Outer Hebrides of Scotland. The name Hecla is Norse for "serrated".

References

External links

Marilyns of Scotland
Mountains and hills of the Outer Hebrides
South Uist